John Doyle (born 17 January 1946) is an Irish Australian soccer coach and former player who was a forward. He won a single cap for the Australia men's national association football team in 1970 and coached the Australia women's national association football team during 1988.

Career

Born in Ireland, Doyle played club football for various teams in the Sydney area. He made one official international appearance for Australia's male team, as a substitute in a 1–0 friendly win over Israel on 10 November 1970. The match was part of a world tour under new coach Rale Rasic. On the tour Doyle took part in a further six matches, scoring two goals, in games which were not considered full international fixtures.

Doyle was put in charge of Australia's women's team two months before their appearance at the 1988 FIFA Women's Invitation Tournament (a pilot World Cup) in China. He resigned after the team performed poorly at the 1989 OFC Women's Championship.

In addition to his soccer career, Doyle worked as a high school maths teacher.

References

External links
 

1946 births
Living people
Republic of Ireland association footballers
Australian soccer players
Australia international soccer players
Irish emigrants to Australia
Association football forwards
Australia women's national soccer team managers